James Bates (September 24, 1789 – February 25, 1882) was a United States representative from Maine. He was born in Greene, Massachusetts (now in Maine), on September 24, 1789. He attended the common schools.

He studied medicine at Harvard Medical School. He was a surgeon during the War of 1812. He was elected as a Jacksonian to the Twenty-second Congress (March 4, 1831 – March 3, 1833). He then became a hospital executive.

He died, aged 92, on February 25, 1882, in Yarmouth, Maine. His interment is in the Old Oak Cemetery, Norridgewock, Maine.

Bates' son, James M. Bates, became a noted physician.

References

External links

1789 births
1882 deaths
Harvard Medical School alumni
People from Androscoggin County, Maine
People from Somerset County, Maine
Jacksonian members of the United States House of Representatives from Maine
19th-century American politicians